Shady Grove, Tennessee may refer to the following places in Tennessee:
Shady Grove, Coffee County, Tennessee
Shady Grove, Crockett County, Tennessee
Shady Grove, Franklin County, Tennessee
Shady Grove, Hamilton County, Tennessee
Shady Grove, Hardin County, Tennessee
Shady Grove, Hickman County, Tennessee
Shady Grove, Jackson County, Tennessee
Shady Grove, Jefferson County, Tennessee
Shady Grove, Knox County, Tennessee
Shady Grove, Lawrence County, Tennessee
Shady Grove, Lincoln County, Tennessee
Shady Grove, Montgomery County, Tennessee
Shady Grove, Morgan County, Tennessee
Shady Grove, Putnam County, Tennessee
Shady Grove, Sevier County, Tennessee
Shady Grove, Trousdale County, Tennessee
Shady Grove, White County, Tennessee